Sanela Knezović (born 22 December 1979) is a Herzegovinian-born Croatian handballer.

Club career 

Knezović started to play handball in 1990 in Mostar. Her first coach was Nikola Stipić. Unfortunately Knezović was forced to take a one-year pause because of Bosnian War. After the war she continued to play handball and in 1994 joined Zrinjski Mostar. In 1996 she received the Best Athlete of Bosnia and Herzegovina award. Same year Knezović signed with European Champions Podravka Vegeta. In eight years of playing for best Croatian team, Knezović won many Croatian Championship and Croatian Cup trophies. In 2002, she played in EHF Cup finals. Two years after that she joined Montenegrin Champions Budućnost and in 2006 won Cup Winners' Cup trophy. In 2007, she went to Hungarian handball club Dunaferr, but because of the club's financial problems she returned to Budućnost. In 2010 Knezović again won Cup Winners' Cup trophy and in 2011 played in Champions League semi-finals. In the 2011/2012 season Sanela Knezović played for Romanian champions CS Oltchim Râmnicu Vâlcea. After one season in Dunaferr, Sanela moved to HC Astrakhanochka on three years contract. She retired from handball in 2015. After retirement, she completed her studies and graduated from Faculty of Kinesiology. She has been in private business ever since.

Achievements
EHF Champions League:
Semifinalist: 2012
Cup Winners' Cup:
Winner: 2006, 2010
Women's Regional Handball League:
Winner: 2010, 2011
Silver Medallist: 2009
Romanian Championship:
Winner: 2012
Hungarian Championship:
Silver Medallist: 2008
Croatian Championship:
Winner: 1996, 1997, 1998, 1999, 2000, 2001, 2002, 2003
Montenegrin Championship:
Winner: 2005, 2006, 2007, 2009, 2010, 2011
Romanian Supercup:
Winner: 2011
Hungarian Cup:
Silver Medallist: 2008
Croatian Cup:
Winner: 1996, 1997, 1998, 1999, 2000, 2001, 2002, 2003, 2004
Montenegrin Cup:
Winner: 2005, 2006, 2007, 2009, 2010, 2011

Individual accomplishments
 Best Athlete of Bosnia and Herzegovina: 1996
 Captain of Croatian national team: 2004

References

External links 
 Official site of Sanela Knezović
 Profile at eurohandball.com

Sportspeople from Mostar
1979 births
Living people
Croatian female handball players
Expatriate handball players
Croatian expatriate sportspeople in Romania
Bosnia and Herzegovina expatriate sportspeople in Romania
Croatian expatriate sportspeople in Hungary
Croatian expatriate sportspeople in Montenegro
RK Podravka Koprivnica players
Bosnia and Herzegovina expatriate sportspeople in Hungary
Bosnia and Herzegovina expatriate sportspeople in Montenegro
Bosnia and Herzegovina expatriate sportspeople in Russia
Croatian expatriate sportspeople in Russia